Musisi is a Ugandan surname. Notable people with the surname include:

Jennifer Musisi, Ugandan lawyer and public administrator 
Majid Musisi (1965–2005), Ugandan football player

Surnames of African origin